Combresomyces is a genus of hyphal, parasitic oomycete known from the fossil record; it infects organisms such as the seed fern Lyginopteris
.

References

External links
 Index Fungorum

Water mould genera
Prehistoric SAR supergroup genera
Carboniferous life
Triassic life
Permian life
Pennsylvanian first appearances
Triassic extinctions